Mollet may refer to:

Places
 Mollet de Peralada, a municipality in Girona, Catalonia, Spain
 Mollet del Vallès, a municipality in  Vallès Oriental Spain, Catalonia, Spain

Persons with the surname
 Mollet family of gardeners:
Jacques Mollet, French gardener
Claude Mollet (circa 1564-shortly before 1649), French gardener to three French kings
André Mollet (died before 16 June 1665), French garden designer
 Clotilde Mollet, French actress
 Florent Mollet (born 1991), French footballer
 Guy Mollet (1905–1975), French politician and prime minister
 Marva Mollet (born 1943), Belgian singer 
 Pierre Mollet (1920–2007), Swiss-Canadian operatic baritone
 Raoul Mollet (1912–2002), Belgian modern pentathlete
 Tommy Mollet (born 1979), Dutch taekwondo practitioner